Joseph Michaels was an American soccer player. He made three appearances for United States men's national soccer team between 1937 and 1947.

Michaels first played for the national team in a 7-3 loss to Mexico on September 19, 1937.  His second game was another blowout loss, 5-1, to Mexico six days later. The U.S. did not play an international game for nearly ten years. In 1947, Michaels club team, Ponta Delgada S.C. won both the National Challenge Cup and National Amateur Cup.  Based on these result, the U.S. Soccer Federation selected Ponta Delgada to represent the United States at the 1947 NAFC Championship. Consequently, Michaels played in the July 20, 1947, 5-2 loss to Cuba. This gave Michaels the U.S. record for the longest gap between national team games, nine years, nine months and twenty-four days.

References

External links
Joseph Michaels' profile at worldfootball.net

American soccer players
United States men's international soccer players
Ponta Delgada S.C. players
Year of birth missing
Year of death missing

Association footballers not categorized by position